Aromatase inhibitors (AIs) are a class of drugs used in the treatment of breast cancer in postmenopausal women and in men, and gynecomastia in men. They may also be used off-label to reduce estrogen conversion when supplementing testosterone exogenously. They may also be used for chemoprevention in women at high risk for breast cancer.

Aromatase is the enzyme that catalyzes a key aromatization step in the synthesis of estrogen. It converts the enone ring of androgen precursors such as testosterone, to a phenol, completing the synthesis of estrogen. As such, AIs are estrogen synthesis inhibitors. Because hormone-positive breast and ovarian cancers are dependent on estrogen for growth, AIs are taken to either block the production of estrogen or block the action of estrogen on receptors.

Medical uses

Cancer
In contrast to premenopausal women, in whom most of the estrogen is produced in the ovaries, in postmenopausal women estrogen is mainly produced in peripheral tissues of the body. Because some breast cancers respond to estrogen, lowering estrogen production at the site of the cancer (i.e. the adipose tissue of the breast) with aromatase inhibitors has been proven to be an effective treatment for hormone-sensitive breast cancer in postmenopausal women. Aromatase inhibitors are generally not used to treat breast cancer in premenopausal women because, prior to menopause, the decrease in estrogen activates the hypothalamus and pituitary axis to increase gonadotropin secretion, which in turn stimulates the ovary to increase androgen production. The heightened gonadotropin levels also upregulate the aromatase promoter, increasing aromatase production in the setting of increased androgen substrate. This would counteract the effect of the aromatase inhibitor in premenopausal women, as total estrogen would increase.

Ongoing areas of clinical research include optimizing adjuvant hormonal therapy in postmenopausal women with breast cancer. Tamoxifen (a SERM) traditionally was the drug treatment of choice, but the ATAC trial (Arimidex, Tamoxifen, Alone or in Combination) showed that in women with localized estrogen receptor-positive breast cancer, women receiving the AI anastrozole had better results than the tamoxifen group. Trials of AIs used as adjuvant therapy, when given to prevent relapse after surgery for breast cancer, show that they are associated with a better disease-free survival than tamoxifen, but few conventionally-analyzed clinicals trials have shown that AIs have an overall survival advantage compared with tamoxifen, and there is no good evidence they are better tolerated.

Gynecomastia
Aromatase inhibitors have been approved for the treatment of gynecomastia in children and adolescents.

Ovulation induction 
Ovarian stimulation with the aromatase inhibitor letrozole has been proposed for ovulation induction in order to treat unexplained female infertility. In a multi-center study funded by the National Institute of Child Health and Development, ovarian stimulation with letrozole resulted in a significantly lower frequency of multiple gestation (i.e., twins or triplets) but also a lower frequency of live birth, as compared with gonadotropin but not with clomiphene.

Side effects
In women, side effects include an increased risk for developing osteoporosis and joint disorders such as arthritis, arthrosis, and joint pain. Men do not appear to exhibit the same adverse effects on bone health. Bisphosphonates are sometimes prescribed to prevent the osteoporosis induced by aromatase inhibitors, but also have another serious side effect, osteonecrosis of the jaw. As statins have a bone strengthening effect, combining a statin with an aromatase inhibitor could help prevent fractures and suspected cardiovascular risks, without potential of causing osteonecrosis of the jaw. The more common adverse events associated with the use of aromatase inhibitors include decreased rate of bone maturation and growth, infertility, aggressive behavior, adrenal insufficiency, kidney failure, hair loss, and liver dysfunction. Patients with liver, kidney or adrenal abnormalities are at a higher risk of developing adverse events.

Mechanism of action

Aromatase inhibitors work by inhibiting the action of the enzyme aromatase, which converts androgens into estrogens by a process called aromatization. As breast tissue is stimulated by estrogens, decreasing their production is a way of suppressing recurrence of the breast tumor tissue. The main source of estrogen is the ovaries in premenopausal women, while in post-menopausal women most of the body's estrogen is produced in peripheral tissues (outside the CNS), and also a few CNS sites in various regions within the brain. Estrogen is produced and acts locally in these tissues, but any circulating estrogen, which exerts systemic estrogenic effects in men and women, is the result of estrogen escaping local metabolism and spreading to the circulatory system.

Types
There are two types of aromatase inhibitors approved to treat breast cancer:

 Irreversible steroidal inhibitors, such as exemestane (Aromasin), forms a permanent and deactivating bond with the aromatase enzyme.
 Nonsteroidal inhibitors, such as the triazoles anastrozole (Arimidex) and letrozole (Femara), inhibit the synthesis of estrogen via reversible competition.

Members

Aromatase inhibitors (AIs) include:

Non-selective
 Aminoglutethimide (Elipten, Cytadren, Orimeten)
 Testolactone (Teslac)

Selective
 Anastrozole (Arimidex)
 Letrozole (Femara)
 Exemestane (Aromasin)
 Vorozole (R-76713; Rivizor)
 Formestane (Lentaron)
 Fadrozole (Afema)

Unknown

 1,4,6-Androstatrien-3,17-dione (ATD)
 4-Androstene-3,6,17-trione ("6-OXO")

In addition to pharmaceutical AIs, some natural elements have aromatase inhibiting effects, such as damiana leaves.

History
The development of aromatase inhibitors was first pioneered by the work of British pharmacologist Angela Brodie at the University of Maryland School of Medicine, first demonstrating efficacy of Formestane in clinical trials in 1982. The drug was first marketed in 1994.

Investigations and research has been undertaken to study the use of aromatase inhibitors to stimulate ovulation, and also to suppress estrogen production. Aromatase inhibitors have been shown to reverse age-related declines in testosterone, including primary hypogonadism. Extracts of certain mushrooms have been shown to inhibit aromatase when evaluated by enzyme assays, with white mushroom having shown the greatest ability to inhibit the enzyme. AIs have also been used experimentally in the treatment of adolescents with delayed puberty.

Research

Research suggests the common table mushroom has anti-aromatase properties and therefore possible anti-estrogen activity. In 2009, a case-control study of the eating habits of 2,018 women in southeast China revealed that women who consumed greater than 10 grams of fresh mushrooms or greater than 4 grams of dried mushrooms per day had an approximately 50% lower incidence of breast cancer. Chinese women who consumed mushrooms and green tea had a 90% lower incidence of breast cancer. However the study was relatively small (2,018 patients participating) and limited to Chinese women of southeast China.

The extract from the herb damiana (Turnera diffusa) has been found to suppress aromatase activity, including the isolated compounds pinocembrin and acacetin.

Natural aromatase inhibitors

See also
 CYP17A1 inhibitor
 Estrogen deprivation therapy
 Selective estrogen receptor degrader

References

External links

 
Hormonal antineoplastic drugs
Progonadotropins